Making the Band is an ABC/MTV reality television series that exists in separate iterations, each focusing on a specific music act. It spawned musical acts O-Town, Da Band, Danity Kane, Day26, and Donnie Klang. Except for the first iteration of the series featuring O-Town, all seasons of Making the Band have been overseen by Diddy, acting as the man of the house who makes the final decision on who will be in the band. 

MTV announced on July 15, 2019, that the series was revived and would premiere in 2020, which was then postponed to 2021 due to the global COVID-19 pandemic. However, this never materialized.

Making the Band
The first iteration of Making the Band started on March 24, 2000, and aired for three seasons, finishing on March 30, 2002.  It centered around the musical group O-Town.

The first season aired on ABC. Making the Band was the last new series, and the only series that was not a sitcom, to air during the original run of the TGIF block. The block ended its run upon the end of the series' first season in 2000. Making the Band was then relocated to cable television network MTV, where two additional seasons aired. Future iterations of the show also aired on MTV.  O-Town's return for additional seasons marked the first time the main cast of a reality show returned for a second season.

Season 1
In 1999, Lou Pearlman, the man responsible for the formation of the Backstreet Boys and NSYNC, embarked on a nationwide talent search, cutting auditions in eight cities down to 25 young men, and eventually to eight finalists. These eight young men would compete for five spots in Pearlman's newest boy band creation, to be signed to his record label, Transcontinental Records.

The season chronicled the competition between the men in typical reality-show fashion. It featured on screen choreography by Ramon Del Barrio. Midway through the first season, three of the eight men (Paul Martin, Mike Miller and Bryan Chan) were eliminated, leaving Ashley Parker Angel, Jacob Underwood, Erik-Michael Estrada (not to be confused with American actor Erik Estrada), Trevor Penick, and Ikaika Kahoano. These five were set to become O-Town and the process of producing their first CD began. Several episodes later, however, Kahoano left for reasons that weren't exactly clear. Kahoano later stated that he "did not respect the other members on a musical or personal level" and described the experience as "wack". He later joined Making the Band semi-finalist Mike Miller and Bryan Chan to form the boy-band LMNT.  Selecting from the original group of 25 semi-finalists, the remaining four members of the band chose Dan Miller to be Kahoano's replacement. With the final member of O-Town in place, the remainder of the first season tracked the development and struggles with the new band.

Seasons 2–3
The second and third seasons continued to track the development of O-Town as a pop group, following tours, performances, and other seminal events in the band's history. Such events included the development of their second CD, O2, their transition to a new record label, Clive Davis' J Records, and an ongoing struggle to "prove themselves" as legitimate artists.

Making the Band 2
The second iteration of Making the Band started on October 19, 2002, and aired for three seasons, finishing on April 29, 2004. It centered around the musical group Da Band and was filmed in various spaces around Manhattan all designed by noted visual artist and designer Ron Norsworthy.

Season 1
In 2002, a new talent search had begun, this time by P. Diddy. Diddy sought to find the best rappers and singers from which to assemble a new hip-hop group. After weeks of selection and training P. Diddy chose the members of the band (Sara Rivers, Dylan Dilinjah, Frederick (Freddy P) Watson, Rodney (Chopper) Hill, Lloyd (Ness) Mathis and Lynese (Babs) Wiley) on the first season of Making the Band 2. 

Orlando (OG) Goodman, Walter (Hammin) Anderson, Kimberly (Mysterious) Bert now known as Misty Blanco, Belinda (Pocahantas) Carter, Damone Coleman, Jamie Huy, Yazmin Mendez, Jonessa Monique, Mina Monroe, Allah Ricks and Jamirah Turner did not make the cut.

Season 2
For several weeks, the contestants lived together and were subjected to difficult tasks, including walking from Midtown Manhattan to Brooklyn to purchase cheesecake for Diddy and reciting the Notorious B.I.G.'s Juicy and the Sugarhill Gang's Rapper's Delight out loud in the Bad Boy Records office. Many altercations between members also took place throughout the season. The finalists were then named Da Band.

Their debut album, Too Hot for TV, was released in September 2003. Their first single was "Bad Boy This, Bad Boy That", and their second was "Tonight". The album was certified gold, selling 600,000 copies.

Season 3
Da Band effectively ended its career at the end of the third season of the show, when P. Diddy dissolved the group during the season finale. However, he still wanted to work with Babs and Ness, calling them hip hop's next "Bonnie and Clyde".  Babs went on the promote the underground rap battle "Queen of the Ring" featured on YouTube and Ness was able to release a song called "My Hood" under the name E. Ness, though it did not chart. Diddy also kept Chopper, now known as Young City, with the label, who signed with Bad Boy South. Sara Stokes, Frederick and Dylan John were the remaining three members of Da Band to be dropped completely from Bad Boy.

Making the Band 3
The third iteration of Making the Band started on March 3, 2005, and aired for three seasons, finishing on August 10, 2006. It centered on the musical group Danity Kane.  Home base interiors were again designed by Ron Norsworthy.

Season 1
After the failure of Bad Boy's Da Band, P. Diddy returned with Making the Band 3 in 2004. This time, he was on the look for the next girl group. With the help of Laurieann Gibson, Doc and Johnny, he set out on a multi city search to find girls who had everything: a great voice, dancing ability and most importantly the looks. The theme song "Oh La La" was recorded by Bad Boy singer Cheri Dennis.

Results

 Roxanne was cut by Laurie Ann.

Season 2
The band performed at the Backstreet Boys concert at the Nissan Pavilion on August 6, 2005. There were two groups. Group one, named "SHE (She Has Everything)", included Aubrey, Melissa, Denosh, Jasmine, and Kelli. Group two, named "Chain 6", included Aundrea, Dawn, Shannon, Wanita, Dominique, and Taquita. During dress rehearsal, group one was the favorite according to Dave, Laurie Anne and Doc. However, the first group was booed as they gave their performance because Denosh started off key on the a cappella which led Aubrey to go off key in the beginning of the song. The second group won, as many screaming girls yelled for them.

The song that each contestant sang in the studio "Tell Me" was actually used by Diddy on his album Press Play. Instead of one of the members of the group who originally sang the song on the show appearing on the track, the vocals are done by Christina Aguilera.

Results

The finale took place on Tuesday, November 15, 2005, where the 11 contestants left competed for five spots in the band. The 11 finalists; Aundrea, Aubrey, Dawn, Jasmine, TaQuita Thorns, Denosh, Wanita, Shannon, Melissa, Kelli, and Dominique, were sent home for three months, told to polish up, and return for the final stretch. When the girls returned after their three-month hiatus, they had to perform numerous acts such as radio interviews, a photo shoot, and dance all of their old dance routines. As Diddy's crew chooses the group, all of the girls went on a last dinner.

They decided on the name Danity Kane. The band's self-titled debut album was released in stores on August 22, 2006 and peaked at #1 on the Billboard charts within its first three weeks of release.

Season 3

Episodes

Making the Band 4
The fourth iteration of Making the Band started on June 18, 2007, and aired for three seasons, finishing on April 23, 2009. It focused on the musical acts Day26 and Donnie Klang.  Season 1 was filmed in a midtown Manhattan with interiors designed by noted visual artist and designer Ron Norsworthy.

Season 1
Diddy begins his search for an all-male super group. This all-male band is widely believed to be the new version of 112 or New Edition as reported earlier in the season.   The season began on June 18, 2007 at 9:00 p.m. The band was finally made on August 26, 2007, consisting of five males from their late teens to their early-to-mid-20s.

Episodes

Diddy's Call-Out

 Given Solo Contract with Bad Boy
 Made the Band
 Eliminated
 Entered the House
 Safe
 Finalists
 Quit'Season 2
Season 2 showed the Making the Band 4 winners and Donnie's debut albums along with Danity Kane's second album coming together. There was a "Making the Band" tour with Danity Kane, the Making the Band 4 winners, and Donnie.  They all moved into the same house and record their new albums and got to know each other a lot more. This was the debut of Danity Kane's second album and Making the Band 4 winners.

The Making the Band 4 boys have a song out called "Got Me Going" (lead single off their debut album). Danity Kane has a confirmed lead single called "Damaged". Fans voted between it and another song, "Pretty Boy". Donnie Klang also has out a song called "Take You There". Both "Damaged" and "Got Me Going" were released to all digital music stores on January 29, 2008.

The group's official name was revealed as Day26 On the February 4, 2008 episode of TRL the boys explained that Day 26 is the band name because August 26, 2007 was the day that they became a band.

Episodes

Season 3
The third season premiered on August 19, 2008, and the series finale aired on April 23, 2009. Season 3 would feature the shows stars on a U.S. Tour, the Making the Band Tour.  On August 12, 2008 there was a 1-hour special that aired on MTV called "Making the Band's Greatest Hits". The special was hosted by Aubrey from Danity Kane, Donnie Klang and Robert from Day26, looking back on past events throughout the seasons of Making the Band 3 and 4.

Instead of "making a band" the show's focus turned into a The Real World-type show, focusing on friendships, relationships, and drama in and out of the studio and the industry.

Episodes

Making His Band
Diddy announced that he was searching for musicians for a Making the Band spin-off titled Making His Band, where he would be searching for guitarists, drummers, backup singers, etc. to form his own personal live band. This new season premiered on July 27, 2009.

On September 2, 2009, this series was placed on hiatus.  On September 12, 2009, the show returned and aired the last five episodes on a new Saturday time slot.  Reasoning for this included a delay in Diddy's album release date as well as generally low ratings overall for the program.

Awards
In 2010, Making His Band was nominated for a GLAAD Media Award for "Outstanding Reality Program" during the 21st GLAAD Media Awards.

See alsoPopstars''

Notes

External links
 That Grape Juice Interviews D. Woods

2000s American reality television series
2000s American music television series
2000 American television series debuts
2009 American television series endings
American Broadcasting Company original programming
Lou Pearlman
MTV original programming
Sean Combs
Television series by Bunim/Murray Productions
Music competitions in the United States
American television series revived after cancellation